Shamanur is a vllage adjacent to Davanagere city and a municipal ward under the municipal corporation of Davanagere city in Davanagere district in the state of Karnataka, India. The predominantly agrarian village, nestled amidst the lush green paddy fields and towering coconut and arecanut orchards, is characterized by its suburban outlook due to its proximity to Davangere city. National Highway 48 separates Shamanur from Davangere city. Shamanur is famous for Sri Anjaneya Swamy Temple.

Gallery

See also
 Davangere
 Sri Anjaneya Swamy Temple, Shamanur

References

Villages in Davanagere district
Davangere